The University of Donja Gorica (Montenegrin and Serbian: Univerzitet Donja Gorica / Универзитет Доња Горица), also known as simply UDG is a private university located in Donja Gorica, a suburb of Podgorica, Montenegro. The university was established in 2007, as the second private university in Montenegro. Its building covers an area of 16,700 m2 and currently represents the largest privately owned facility in the country.

In 2022 UDG became part of the "Powered by Arizona State University" group of universities, through partnership with Cintana Alliance.

Organization 

The university comprises the following 13 faculties:
 Faculty of International Economics, Finances and Business
 Entrepreneurship, Management and Business
 Faculty of Legal Sciences
 Faculty of Information Systems and Technology
 Humanistic Studies
 Diplomacy
 Security
 Communication Studies and Media
 Faculty of Arts
 Polytechnics
 Faculty of Sports Management
 Faculty for Food Technology, Food Safety and Ecology
 Faculty of Design and Multimedia
 Graphic design
 Fashion design
 Faculty of Culture and Tourism
Chinese studies
 Faculty of Applied Sciences 
 Applied Psychology
 Applied Mathematics
 International Hotel Management
 English Language and Literature

The Centre for Foreign Languages is also a part of the university.

References

External links 

 Official website

Donja Gorica
Donja Gorica
Donja Gorica
2007 establishments in Montenegro